Emil Rameau (born Emil Pulvermacher; 13 August 1878 – 9 September 1957) was a German film and theatre actor, and for many years the deputy artistic director at the Schiller Theater. He appeared in nearly 100 films between 1915 and 1949.

Life and career 
After his graduation from Realschule Rameau got an actor. His first role was Marcellus in Julius Caesar in Bromberg (today Bydgoszcz in Poland). In 1906 he went to the Schiller Theater in Berlin, where Rameau worked with Leopold Jessner. From 1923 until 1931 he was the vicarious intendant at the Schiller theater. He directed some plays at the Volksbühne. Emil Rameau worked also with Max Reinhardt at the Deutsches Theater. Rameau made his film debut in 1915 and appeared regularly in German silent films, mostly in character roles.

After the Nazis seized power in 1933, Rameau escaped through Switzerland, the Netherlands, Italy, and Great Britain to the United States. During the Second World War, he had small appearances in over 20 Hollywood movies. In the 1944 mystery-thriller Gaslight, Rameau played Maestro Guardi, Ingrid Bergman's Italian singing teacher, which was perhaps his most recognizable role in Hollywood. He made his last film appearance in Hollywood in 1949 and returned to Germany, where he worked as a stage actor. In 1951, he was named the deputy artistic director of the Schiller theatre.

Selected filmography

 Der Fall Klerk (1916) - Jan Klerk
 Arthur Imhoff (1916) - Ernst Kerber
 Der Sekretär der Königin (1916)
 Abseits vom Glück (1916) - Joachim, Graf von Olmerode
 Das goldene Friedelchen (1916) - Caspar, Diener bei Ferdinand Strecker
 The Wandering Light (1916) - Major von Glassner
 The Uncanny House (1916) - Herr Eibner
 Der chinesische Götze - Das unheimliche Haus, 3. Teil (1916) - Chinesischer Priester
 Freitag, der 13. - Das unheimliche Haus, 2. Teil (1916) - Eibner
 Friedrich Werders Sendung (1916)
 The Man in the Mirror (1916)
 Das Leid der Liebe (1916)
 Life Is a Dream (1916) - Vater
 Das Kind des Anderen (1916)
 Stein unter Steinen (1917) - Steinmetz Zarncke
 Der standhafte Benjamin (1917)
 Für die Ehre des Vaters (1917) - Arbeiter Wendelin
 Der lebende Leichnam (1918) - Iwan Makarowitsch
 Die Singende Hand (1918) - Ministerpräsident
 Im Zeichen der Schuld (1918) - Kapitän Vernon
 The Devil (1918)
 Strandgut oder Die Rache des Meeres (1918)
 Das Alte Bild (1918)
 Die rote Herzogin (1919) - Guido Ferrari - Maler
 Zwischen Tod und Leben (1919) - Valentin
 Wehrlose Opfer (1919)
 Hedda's Rache (1919) - Ludwig Gerlach, Kaufmann
 The Panther Bride (1919) - Dr. Duffoir
 Die Dame im Auto (1919) - Torleif Hansen - Makler
 The Mask (1919)
 The Spies (1919) - Dr. Mahon
 Jettatore (1919) - Fürst Jellinow
 Die Tochter des Bajazzo (1919)
 Lillis Ehe (1919) - Baumeister Stein
 Lilli (1919) - Baumeister Stein
 The Devil and the Madonna (1919) - Meister Tradler
 Sins of the Parents (1919)
 Der Tempel der Liebe (1919)
 Der Kampf um die Ehe - 2. Teil: Feindliche Gatten (1919)
 Der Kampf um die Ehe - 1. Teil: Wenn in der Ehe die Liebe stirbt (1919) - Lisas Father
 Out of the Depths (1919) - Geheimpolizei-Chef
 Hypnosis (1920) - Peter Hain
 Der rote Henker (1920) - Marquis von Brichauteau
 Prinzesschen (1920) - Hofarzt
 Indian Revenge (1920) - 2. Inder
 The Love of a Thief (1920)
 The White Peacock (1920) - Alter
 Föhn (1920) - Gutsbesitzer von Rodius
 Pricess Woronzoff (1920)
 Themis (1920)
 Madame Récamier (1920) - Dufrand
 Die Benefiz-Vorstellung der vier Teufel (1920)
 Entblätterte Blüten (1920)
 Colombine (1920)
 The Maharaja's Favourite Wife (1921) - Vater des Maharadscha
 Die große und die kleine Welt (1921)
 Der tote Gast (1921)
 Sturmflut des Lebens (1921) - Arzt
 Das gestohlene Millionenrezept (1921)
 Roswolsky's Mistress (1921) - Kapellmeister
 Die sterbende Stadt (1921) - Prof. Gottlieb Wiesinger
 The Railway King (1921)
 Your Brother's Wife (1921)
 Der Fluch des Schweigens (1922)
 His Excellency from Madagascar (1922)
 The Curse of Silence (1922) - Friscard
 Monna Vanna (1922) - Frederigo Fondalo
 Lola Montez, the King's Dancer (1922)
 The Treasure of Gesine Jacobsen (1923) - Jörg, Olafs Diener
 Der allmächtige Dollar (1923)
 William Tell (1923) - Der Kanzler
 Vineta. Die versunkene Stadt (1923)
 The Hungarian Princess (1923)
 The Sensational Trial (1923) - Untersuchungsrichter
 Struggle for the Soil (1925) - Moses Hirsch
 Love's Finale (1925) - Professor Troste
 ...und es lockt ein Ruf aus sündiger Welt (1925)
 The Mill at Sanssouci (1926) - General Winterfeldt
 The Wiskottens (1926) - Der Färber Barthelmes
 Frauen, die den Weg verloren (1926) - Legationsrat von Wallburg
 Carnival Magic (1927) - Der Großvater
 Stolzenfels am Rhein (1927) - Murat
 Yacht of the Seven Sins (1928) - Bürovorsteher
 Das deutsche Lied (1928) - Heinrich von der Vogelweide
 Möblierte Zimmer (1929) - Chef des Warenhauses
 Only on the Rhine (1930) - Der Bürgermeister
 The Adventurer of Tunis (1931) - Prokurist bei Bertell
 Manolescu, der Fürst der Diebe (1933)
 The Shanghai Gesture (1941) - Roulette Player (uncredited)
 Mission to Moscow (1943) - Ignacy Paderewski (uncredited)
 Gaslight (1944) - Maestro Guardi
 Greenwich Village (1944) - Kavosky
 The Conspirators (1944) - Professor Wingby (uncredited)
 Her Highness and the Bellboy (1945) - Mr. Korb (uncredited)
 Scotland Yard Investigator (1945) - Prof. Renault
 Two Sisters from Boston (1946) - Nervous Conductor (uncredited)
 Two Smart People (1946) - Riverboat Waiter (uncredited)
 So Dark the Night (1946) - Pere Cortot
 The Return of Monte Cristo (1946) - Florist (uncredited)
 The Ghost Goes Wild (1947) - Prof. Jacques Dubonnet
 Time Out of Mind (1947) - Alfred Stern
 Where There's Life (1947) - Dr. Josefsberg
 The Main Street Kid (1948) - Max
 Arch of Triumph (1948) - Mr. Schultz (uncredited)
 Cry of the City (1948) - Dr. Niklas (uncredited)
 The Great Sinner (1949) - Fearful Old Man (uncredited)
 Sword in the Desert (1949) - Old Man - Dov's Father
 The Red Danube (1949) - Proprietor (uncredited)
 The Lady Takes a Sailor (1949) - Dr. Mittenwald (uncredited) (final film role)

References

External links
 

1878 births
1957 deaths
German male film actors
German male silent film actors
German male stage actors
Male actors from Berlin
Exiles from Nazi Germany
20th-century German male actors
Officers Crosses of the Order of Merit of the Federal Republic of Germany